Troy Stecher (born April 7, 1994) is a Canadian professional ice hockey defenceman for the Calgary Flames of the National Hockey League (NHL). He previously played for the Vancouver Canucks, Detroit Red Wings, Los Angeles Kings and Arizona Coyotes. 

Undrafted into the NHL, Stecher played for the University of North Dakota for three seasons. In his last season, he was honoured as a Second-Team All-American West, All-NCHC Second Team, and NCHC Offensive Defenseman of the Year.

Playing career

Amateur
Stecher began playing hockey at the age of six with the Richmond Minor Hockey Association. After graduating from Alfred B Dixon Elementary, Stecher attended South Delta Secondary School due to their hockey academy while still playing in bantam hockey. Despite being selected in the 2009 WHL Draft by the Portland Winterhawks, Stecher chose instead to play with the Penticton Vees of the BCHL to better develop as a player.

In his second year with the Vees, Stecher was named an Assistant Captain as he helped guide the Vees to the national junior ‘A’ Championship. Although Stecher was loaned to Team Canada West for the 2011 World Junior A Challenge, he still registered a career-high 42 points in 53 games during the regular season. While playing in the RBC Cup, Stecher recorded 10 points in 15 games and was named the Royal Bank Cup's top defenceman.

On June 28, 2012, Stecher was named team captain for the 2012–13 season. It was during this season, his final year with the Penticton Vees, that Stecher committed to playing NCAA hockey for the University of North Dakota. At the conclusion of the 2012–13 season, Stecher was named to the BCHL First-Team All-Star and awarded the Top Defenceman Trophy for the Interior.

Collegiate
Stecher played three seasons of college hockey with the University of North Dakota.

In his freshman year at North Dakota, Stecher played in all 42 games, the only freshman to do so. He ended the season with 11 points in 42 games.

In his last year of draft eligibility, Stecher was passed over in the 2014 NHL Entry Draft, the third straight draft he was not selected in. As such, Stecher returned to North Dakota for his sophomore season. During a December game against the Lake Superior State Lakers, Stecher was injured and was expected to miss 6–8 weeks to recover. After missing eight games, Stecher returned for a 3–2 loss against Nebraska Omaha on January 30. He ended the season with 13 points in 34 games.

In his last year at North Dakota, Stecher set a career high with 29 points in 43 games. He was named a Second-Team All-American West at the conclusion of the 2015–16 season and selected for the All-NCHC Second Team. He was also named a finalist for NCHC Defenseman of the Year and NCHC Offensive Defenseman of the Year, winning a national title with North Dakota.  Following his outstanding third season, the Vancouver Canucks signed him to a two-year entry-level contract on April 13, 2016.

Professional

Vancouver Canucks
Stecher was a late cut from the Canucks' 2016 training camp and was sent to their AHL affiliate, the Utica Comets to start the season. After playing in the Comets' first four games and tallying an assist, he was recalled to the Canucks on October 24, 2016. He made his NHL debut the next day, logging 22:35 minutes of ice time in a 3–0 loss to the Ottawa Senators. As a result,  Stecher became the first player born and raised in Richmond, British Columbia to play for the Canucks. His first career assist and point came on a Daniel Sedin goal on November 5 in a 6–3 loss to the Toronto Maple Leafs. In the same game, he was hit by Leafs enforcer Matt Martin in the 3rd period and a line brawl proceeded.

He scored his first NHL goal against Kari Lehtonen on November 13 in a 5–4 overtime victory against the Dallas Stars. On March 26, 2017 he left a game against the Winnipeg Jets with an upper-body injury due to a fall into the boards after a collision with a Jets player. Stecher healed well enough to play on the Friday game.

During the Canucks 2017–18 season opener, Stecher recorded his first NHL fight against Edmonton Oilers forward Ryan Strome. On October 24, 2017 the Canucks announced via Twitter that Stecher would be out 4-to-6 weeks with a knee injury that was caused in a game against the Detroit Red Wings. He returned to the Canucks lineup on November 24, 2017, after missing 14 games. Stecher concluded the regular season with 11 points in 68 games. On July 20, 2018, Stecher signed a two year, $4.65 million deal with the Canucks.

Detroit Red Wings
After not being tendered a qualifying offer by the Canucks, Stecher became a unrestricted free agent. On October 10, 2020, Stecher signed a two-year, $3.4 million contract with the Detroit Red Wings.

Los Angeles Kings
On March 20, 2022, in the final year of his contract, Stecher was dealt by Detroit to the Los Angeles Kings in exchange for a 2022 seventh-round draft pick. Stecher tallied 1 assist through the remaining 13 regular season games with the Kings. Drawing into the lineup for the playoffs in a first-round encounter with the Edmonton Oilers, Stecher recorded 2 goals and 4 points in just 4 games.

Arizona Coyotes
As a free agent from the Kings, Stecher was signed to a one-year, $1.25 million contract with the Arizona Coyotes on July 13, 2022.

Calgary Flames
On March 3, 2023, Stecher, along with Nick Ritchie, was traded to the Calgary Flames from the Coyotes for Connor Mackey and Brett Ritchie.

International play

On April 29, 2019, Stecher was selected to make his international debut after he was named to the Team Canada roster for the 2019 IIHF World Championship, held in Slovakia. He helped Canada progress through to the playoff rounds before losing the final to Finland to finish with the Silver Medal on May 26, 2019. Stecher finished the tournament posting one goal and two points in ten games from the blueline.

Stecher won the Gold Medal with Team Canada at the 2021 IIHF World Championship, beating Finland 3-2 in overtime on June 6, 2021. He had an assist on the game-winning overtime goal in Canada's quarterfinal match against Russia, finishing the tournament with two points in ten games.

Personal life
Stecher was born to parents Tracey and Peter Stecher alongside his two older siblings.

He has a Bernese Mountain Dog named Phoebe.

Career statistics

Regular season and playoffs

International

References

External links
 

1994 births
Living people
AHCA Division I men's ice hockey All-Americans
Arizona Coyotes players
Canadian expatriate ice hockey players in the United States
Canadian ice hockey defencemen
Calgary Flames players
Detroit Red Wings players
Ice hockey people from British Columbia
Los Angeles Kings players
North Dakota Fighting Hawks men's ice hockey players
Penticton Vees players
People from Richmond, British Columbia
Undrafted National Hockey League players
University of North Dakota alumni
Utica Comets players
Vancouver Canucks players